JTV may refer to:

Broadcasting
 Jeepney TV, a Philippine television network
 Jewelry Television, an American television network
 JTV (Indonesian TV channel), a television station in Surabaya, Indonesia
 JTV (New Zealand), a New Zealand Japanese language television channel
 Jeonju Television, a regional television and radio broadcasting company in Jeonju, South Korea
 Justin.tv, a forerunner online video service which established the current-day service Twitch
 Juventus TV, the official video service and television network of the Italian football club Juventus F.C.
 Triple J TV, a television series spin-off of the Australian radio station Triple J

Music
 JTV (album), a 2007 Justin Lo album

Television
 JTV (The Batman), an episode of the animated television series The Batman
 Jane the Virgin, an American drama series